Curtain Call is a 2000 American short documentary film directed by Charles Braverman. It was nominated for an Academy Award for Best Documentary Short.

Synopsis
Curtain Call tells the story of eight remarkable residents of the Actors' Fund Retirement Home. These residents are still full of vitality as they recall tales of Broadway's golden age, and what they have done with their lives.

Awards and nominations

See also
 List of documentary films
 List of American films of 2000

References

External links

2000 films
2000 independent films
American short documentary films
2000 short documentary films
American independent films
Films directed by Charles Braverman
Documentary films about actors
Documentary films about old age
2000s English-language films
2000s American films